Yevgeni Igorevich Kuznetsov (born 2 June 2000) is a Russian football player who plays for FC Dynamo Barnaul.

Club career
He made his debut in the Russian Football National League for FC Irtysh Omsk on 1 August 2020 in a game against FC Yenisey Krasnoyarsk, he substituted Vadim Zubavlenko in the 55th minute.

References

External links
 
 Profile by Russian Football National League
 

2000 births
Sportspeople from Barnaul
Living people
Russian footballers
Association football midfielders
FC Dynamo Barnaul players
FC Irtysh Omsk players
FC Chita players
Russian First League players
Russian Second League players